These are The Official UK Charts Company UK Official Indie Chart number-one hits of the 1990.

References

Indie 1990
1990 in British music
United Kingdom Indie Singles